Tom Brennan (born May 2, 1949) is a radio and television sportscaster and former men's basketball head coach at the University of Vermont from 1986 to 2005.

Coaching career 
Raised in Phillipsburg, New Jersey, Brennan graduated as the all-time leading scorer at Phillipsburg Catholic High School. Brennan graduated from the University of Georgia in 1971, where, as a senior, he received the men's basketball team leadership award.

He began his coaching after graduating in the fall of 1971 as a graduate assistant at Georgia under Ken Rosemond. Sandwiched around a year as head basketball and baseball coach at Division III Fairleigh Dickinson University in Madison, New Jersey, Brennan was an assistant under college basketball coaches Rollie Massimino at Villanova, Bill Raftery at Seton Hall and Bruce Parkhill at William & Mary. In 1982, he was named head coach at Yale where he crafted a four-year record of 46–58, including back-to-back seasons of 14–12 and 13–13. At Yale, he coached players such as Earl "Butch" Graves and NBA veteran Chris Dudley.

In 19 years at Vermont, Brennan led the Catamounts to four 20+ win seasons, three America East championships and UVM's first three NCAA Tournament appearances, including the school's first NCAA Tournament win over BIG EAST champion Syracuse in 2005. Brennan is one of two coaches in America East history to lead his team to three consecutive conference titles.

Brennan's last four Vermont teams brought unprecedented positive national publicity to the men's basketball program and to the school. During his last season, Vermont became the first and only America East team to sell out every one of its home games at Patrick Gymnasium. During the second half of the 2004–05 season the Catamounts were the subject of five parts of ESPN's critically acclaimed nationally televised series, 'The Season.' UVM's upset also was nominated for an ESPY award in 2005.

Standouts that Brennan coached at Vermont include Eddie Benton, the 1996 winner of the Frances Pomeroy Naismith Award given to the nation's top senior less than 6-feet tall, Matt Johnson, Kevin Roberson, Trevor Gaines, T.J. Sorrentine and Taylor Coppenrath, a finalist in 2005 for both the John Wooden and James Naismith National Player of the Year Awards, the first and only America East player to be on a final ballot for National Player of the Year.

Broadcast career 
During his coaching career, Brennan co-hosted a morning radio show in Burlington, Vermont called "Corm and the Coach," with radio personality Steve Cormier, which began on WIZN-FM 106.7 FM in 1992.  In 1998, the pair moved to WCVP-FM 101.3 and WCVR-FM 102.1 until July 2008, when Brennan decided to retire from his position as morning radio personality. In November 2009, Brennan and Cormier teamed up again to bring "Corm and the Coach" briefly back on the air on 107.1 WNMR before moving to television on WCAXtra TV and on the internet on NSN.net until 2011.  Brennan delivers Saturday Night Live-style sports reports and his thoughts on basketball, politics, entertainment, local news and psychology. The Coach's repertoire also included live, pre-dawn wake-up calls to his players and coaching colleagues. In the 2003 and 2004 off-seasons, he also was a co-host on several ESPN national radio shows.

After his retirement from coaching in 2005, Brennan joined ESPN working as a college basketball studio analyst as well as doing color commentary across the ESPN family of networks. He worked at ESPN until 2009. In December 2010, Brennan joined Sirius XM Radio as a co-host of College Basketball Today that airs during the college hoops season. Brennan also does radio commentary for college basketball on Westwood One, now known as Dial Global Sports, as well as television work for NBC Sports Network, appearing as a college basketball analyst on NBC SportsTalk.

Accomplishments 
 Hired by Sirius XM and Westwood One (Dial Global Sports) Radio in 2009 as a national college basketball radio show host and game analyst
 Hired as a National College Basketball Analyst by ESPN in 2005
 Led team to a defeat of BIG EAST champion Syracuse University in the first round of the 2005 NCAA tournament
 2005 America East Champions
 2004 America East Champions
 2003 America East Champions
 2002 America East Regular Season Champions
 1992 America East Coach of the Year
 1998 America East Coach of the Year
 2002 America East Coach of the Year
 1992 NABC District I (New England) Coach of the Year
 2002 NABC District I (New England) Coach of the Year
 2005 New Jersey Sportswriters National Coach of the Year
 All-Time Leader in Games Coached At Vermont
 All-Time Leader in Victories At Vermont

Family 
Brennan and his wife, Lynn reside on Lake Champlain in Colchester, Vermont. He has two children: Kelly, who graduated from UVM in 1993 and Brian who was a standout guard at Indiana (Pa.) University, which reached the NCAA D-II Elite Eight in 2000. He has four grandchildren; Caleb, Brennan, Ryder, and Jordan.

Head coaching record

References

1949 births
Living people
American men's basketball players
Basketball coaches from Vermont
Basketball coaches from New Jersey
Basketball players from New Jersey
College men's basketball head coaches in the United States
Georgia Bulldogs basketball coaches
Georgia Bulldogs basketball players
People from Colchester, Vermont
People from Phillipsburg, New Jersey
Seton Hall Pirates men's basketball coaches
Sportspeople from Burlington, Vermont
Sportspeople from Warren County, New Jersey
Vermont Catamounts men's basketball coaches
Villanova Wildcats men's basketball coaches
William & Mary Tribe men's basketball coaches
Yale Bulldogs men's basketball coaches